The Blanc de Bouscat is a large white rabbit originally bred in France in 1906, with Argente Champagne, French Angora and Flemish Giant in its heritage. It is very rare in the UK and considered a breed at risk in France.

It is a recognised breed by the British Rabbit Council, it is not recognised by the American Rabbit Breeders Association.

See also

List of rabbit breeds

References

Rabbit breeds
Rabbit breeds originating in France